The Jamaica national netball team, commonly known as the Sunshine Girls, represent Jamaica in international netball competitions. Netball is not only the number one women's sport in Jamaica but also the number one team sport in the island, based on World Rankings and recent history and the majority of the schools in Jamaica participate. Netball receives full media coverage on television, radio and in newspapers but does not get as much coverage as less successful team sports such as football and cricket. Jamaica were coached by former representative Oberon Pitterson, and captained by midcourt veteran Nadine Bryan up to the end of 2013. However, a Technical Director (Jill McIntosh) and new coach (Minneth Reynolds), were appointed in early 2014. As of 1 July 2020, Jamaica are fourth in the INF World Rankings. The senior Jamaican netball team is widely known as the Sunshine Girls, the Jamaican Fast 5 netball team is known as Jamaica Fast5 or the FAST5 Girls.

History
Netball in Jamaican schools started in 1909. In 1959, the Jamaica Netball Association was formed and affiliated with the West Indies Netball Board. Jamaica was invited to compete at the 1959 West Indies Tournament held in August in Montserrat.

Since their debut international game in 1959, the Sunshine Girls have participated in every INF Netball World Cup, never finishing below sixth. Jamaica placed third in three World Championships – in 1991, 2003 and 2007. They have played in all six Commonwealth Games netball events to date, winning a bronze medal in 2002 in Manchester, 2014 in Glasgow, Scotland and 2018 in Gold Coast, Australia.

Pitterson was appointed the new head coach for the Sunshine Girls at the 2011 World Netball Championships in Singapore. Longstanding captain Simone Forbes did not attend the World Championships after testing positive the banned substance Clomiphene and was replaced by Nadine Bryan. Forbes subsequently retired, ending her illustrious career. After failing to medal in 2011, some of the experienced players on the squad decided to take a break from the national team, while Althea Byfield chose to retire, as they had grown disgruntled with embattled coach Pitterson. Malysha Kelly & Romelda Aiken took over co-captaining duties at the 2013 Fast5 tournament and Kelly continued to captain the team in the first half of 2014. Nicole Aiken-Pinnock took over as captain ahead of the 2014 Commonwealth Games and also captained them at the 2015 Netball World Cup. The team has since won bronze medals in both the 2014 and 2018 Commonwealth Games, with the latter medal having been won against two-time gold medallists New Zealand.

Players

2022 squad
The current squad was selected for the 2022 Commonwealth Games.

Notable past players
 Connie Francis
 Elaine Davis
 Simone Forbes
 Carla Borrego
 Oberon Pitterson

Most-capped Jamaican netballers

Competitive history

Kit suppliers
Jamaica's kits are currently supplied by Gilbert.

See also
 CWG 2002 Results
 CWG 2006 SSG Roster
Jamaican netball players

External links
 Sunshine Girls Squad
 SSG at NWC

References

 
National netball teams of the Americas
Netball in Jamaica